Upholstery is a music collective from Philadelphia, Pennsylvania. Formed in 2007, the group's musical style draws heavily from early and mid-20th century music of the United States, including blues, swing, and rhythm and blues mixed with elements of math rock, jazz, and chamber music. The band's recorded output consists of studio-produced concept albums, background scores created for independent theater productions, and musical selections from its telenovela theater alter-ego, Señor Papos. Upholsery's live performances are characterized by the use of theatrical stagecraft, character-based costumes, props, and puppetry.

History

Formation and First Album

Upholstery first assembled in 2007 as a moniker for a collaborative project headed by songwriter and multi-instrumentalist Jeremy Prouty. Brought together to record the full-length album 6New Platitudes in 2008, the group initially consisted of a rotating cast of players with Prouty acting as songwriter and conceptual lead. Alison Conard provided instrumental and vocal backing, plus sound engineering, mixing and production support. In 2009, Prouty assembled a new configuration of musicians under the Upholstery umbrella to create the live score for C.W. Kennedy's Philadelphia Fringe Festival production, Rails.

After a series of shows following the release of Upholstery's first album, Prouty and Conard began production on a second, Clydesdales & Tardigrades. That year, drummer Corey Mark, who had contributed to the first album, returned to play a more active creative role. At the completion of album production in late 2010, John Wilder joined on bass, in preparation for the record's release in early 2011. With Conard stepping away from the project at the completion of the Clydesdales & Tardigrades, Prouty, Mark and Wilder came together to become a regularly performing band. This marked a key period of growth and transformation for the newly formed group, with multi-instrumentalist Dorie Byrne coming aboard to play accordion. Soon after, Byrne shifted to keyboard duties as Upholstery scored and later performed music for the C.W. Kennedy's theater production Water Bears In Space, which was heralded as a standout production of the 2011 Philadelphia Fringe Festival. Following Water Bears''' success, Upholstery continued performing and cohering as a band, moving fully away from its roots as a recording project driven exclusively by Prouty

Señor Papos

As a side project, Kennedy and Prouty created the satirical stage personalities Señor Herequeque Papos and Jota Miraflores, caricatures of Spanish cultural stereotypes to be performed in drag as a musical theatre series in the style of telenovelas. Musical selections combined renditions of well-known English-language pop songs, translated into Spanish, with original compositions centering around Papos' hyper-masculine affinity for love, wine and ham. Joined by Fernando Regicio Jr. on guitar, their first studio effort resulted in the EP Muchos Detalles in 2011. The trio would continue to develop installments of the drama over time, inviting other performers to adapt characters to be incorporated into the increasingly sordid and bizarre melodrama.

Recent activity

Following a banner year of art-making, Upholstery—now consisting of Prouty, Mark, Wilder and Byrne—spent the majority of 2012 focusing on live performance. Late in the year, Prouty began assembling songs for Upholstery's next album and in early 2013 produced a selection of demos for Running the Badwater as raw material for a concept album containing multiple intertwined storylines. At this time Kate Black-Regan joined the group as a dedicated lead vocalist. Actress, poet, and musician, Black-Regan was long-time actor in the theater productions for which Upholstery provided musical backing, and she brought a heightened level of stagecraft and a dramatic persona to the group. In the following months, the new five-piece configuration of the band began pre-production for a full-length album, the first for which Prouty did not write all lyrics and songs. Byrne began applying digital effects to the amplified signal of her accordion, thereby extending the group's sonic texture into the electronic realm. Creative work by the group intensified in order to complete writing and rehearsing the new album, and in mid-2013 Upholstery entered into the studio. Conard long since having departed the collective, the group partnered with the intrepid sound engineers of the Sex Dungeon to produce Running the Badwater as a full-length record released in late 2013. Members of the group adapted and costumed themselves as characters from the concept album.

Style and themes

Upholstery's music does not clearly fall into one contemporary musical genre; though it may be generally described as eclectic post-progressive. Lyrical themes are inspired by noir fiction, science fiction, and historical fantasy and employ world-building, allegory, and abstract poetry.

Band members

Timeline

Full time
Jeremy Prouty (founding member) – Vocals, Guitar, Bass (2007–present)
Corey Mark – Drums (2007–2018)
John Wilder – Bass, Gusto (2010–2014, 2017–present)
Dorie Byrne – Accordion, Trombone, Flute, Vocals (2011–present)
Kate Black-Regan – Vocals (2013–2015, 2017–present)
C.W. Kennedy – Violin, Vocals (2014–present)
Rachel Icenogle – cello (2015–present)

Frequent guests
Sean McPhee – Audio/Video Production (2011–present)
David Fishkin – Tenor Sax (2007–present)
Dan Blacksberg – Trombone (2007–present)
Kevin James Holland – Vocals (2009–present)
Martin Gottlieb-Hollis – Trumpet (member 2013–2016, guest 2017–present)
Nick Millevoi – Guitar (2014–present)

Past members

Alison Conard – Keys, Guitar, Vocals, Sound Engineering, Production (2007–2014)
Johnny DeBlase – Bass (2007–2008)
Sam Allingham – Bass (2015–2016)
Jason Carr – Synthesizer 
Justin Gibbon – Drums
Dawn Webster – Trumpet
Daby Byrne – Baritone Sax, Electronic Noise

Discography

Albums
 6New Platitudes (2008)
 Clydesdales and Tardigrades (2011)
 Running the Badwater (2014)

EPs
 Muchos Detalles, Pocos Hechos (2011)
 Running the Badwater [the demos] (2013)
 Papos Does Pop! (2015)

Compilations
 Rails (2009)
 Live in Eleven (2011)
 Water Bears in Space! (2011)

Theatrical scores

 Rails (2009)
 Water Bears In Space (2011)
 Jug Baby (2014)
 A Porch at the Edge of the World'' (2015)

References

Musical groups from Philadelphia